"Abou Ben Adhem" is a poem written in 1834 by the English critic, essayist and poet Leigh Hunt. It concerns a pious Middle Eastern sheikh who finds the 'love of God' to have blessed him. The poem has been praised for its non-stereotypical depiction of an Arab. Hunt claims through this poem that true worship manifests itself through the acts of love and service that one shows one's fellowmen and women. The character of 'Abou Ben Adhem' is said to have been based on the ascetic Sufi mystic Ibrahim bin Adham. The poem, due to its Middle Eastern setting and spiritualistic undertones, can be considered an example of Romantic Orientalism. The first known appearance of this poem is in an album kept by the writer Anna Maria Hall, whose husband, Samuel Carter Hall published it in 1834, in his gift book The Amulet.

Analysis 

The poem shows a surprisingly liberal attitude for its time, and espouses the belief that true worship is in the service of others. The angel is said to be a representation of God's omnipresence, which observes anything and anyone.

Apart from the end rhyme scheme, Hunt uses alliteration to enrich the cadence of the poem. Some examples are:

Abou Ben Adhem  (Line 1)

Deep dream of peace (Line 2)

Nay, not so  (Line 11)

I pray thee then (Line 13)

The poem is written in a narrative style, and it is structured into four stanzas of 5, 5, 4 and 4 lines. Here, the stanzas are ‘closed’ and so are the couplets (the pairs of rhyming lines), — i.e., they end with punctuation. While the poem is metrically flexible, it essentially displays an iambic pentameter style.

The poem draws from Arabian lore, where in the Islamic month of Nous Sha'ban, God takes the golden book of mankind and chooses those dear to Him who He will call in the coming year. Thus indirectly, this is also a poem about a ‘blessed death’. Leigh Hunt's source for this was Barthélemy d'Herbelot, Bibliothèque orientale, first published in 1697. However, while d'Herbelot has Abou-Ishak-Ben-Adhem ask God to write him down as one who loves the Lord ('écrivez-moi, je vous prie, pour l'amour d'eux, en qualité d'ami de ceux qui aiment Dieu'), the poem has him say "Write me as one, that loves his fellow men".

Russell Jones, in the Journal of the Royal Asiatic Society, writes that the identification of Abou Ben Adham with Ibrahim ibn Adham was through two notes by H. Beveridge and V.A. Smith in the same journal in 1909 and 1910.

In popular culture 
The verse “Write me as one who loves his fellow men” came to be used in Hunt's epitaph, unveiled by Lord Haughton in 1869 at Kensal Green in North Kensington. The musical Flahooley features a genie named Abou Ben Atom, based on either Ibrahim or Abou played in the original 1951 Broadway production by Irwin Corey.
It was used in the British satirical television programme Not the Nine O'Clock News, being simultaneously translated into mock Welsh by Rowan Atkinson.

In school curricula 
"Abou Ben Adhem" is one of the prescribed poems in the 10th grade English Literature syllabus for the nationwide CISCE board exam in India.

References 

Poetry about spirituality
Islamic poetry